The 1986 Purdue Boilermakers football team represented Purdue University as a member of the Big Ten Conference during the 1986 NCAA Division I-A football season. Led by Leon Burtnett in his fifth and final season as head coach, the Boilermakers compiled an overall record of 3–8 with a mark of 2–6 in conference play, placing in a three-way tie for eighth in the Big Ten. Purdue played home games at Ross–Ade Stadium in West Lafayette, Indiana.

Schedule

Personnel

Season summary

Ball State

Pittsburgh

at Notre Dame

Minnesota

at Illinois

Ohio State

at Michigan State

at Northwestern

Michigan

at Iowa

Indiana

Purdue wore gold jerseys; In his final collegiate game, Rod Woodson gained over 150 combined rushing and receiving yards, in addition to making ten tackles and forcing a fumble, leading Purdue to a victory over arch-rival Indiana.  This 50th victory in the series, kept indiana from receiving a bowl berth and denied anthony thompson the Heisman Trophy.

1987 NFL Draft

References

Purdue
Purdue Boilermakers football seasons
Purdue Boilermakers football